Yevhen Anatoliovych Apryshko (born 23 January 1985) is a Ukrainian football midfielder currently playing for Ukrainian Second League club Kremin.

Club history
Evhen Apryshko began his football career in UOR Donetsk in Donetsk. He signed with FC Kremin Kremenchuk during 2007 summer transfer window.

Career statistics

References

External links
 Profile – Official Kremin site
 FC Kremin Kremenchuk Squad on the PFL website
 
 

1985 births
Living people
FC Nafkom Brovary players
FC Kremin Kremenchuk players
FC Stal Kamianske players
FC Tytan Armyansk players
Ukrainian footballers
Ukrainian First League players
Ukrainian Second League players
Association football midfielders
Sportspeople from Donetsk Oblast